The People's Sovereignty Party (PKR) is a minor political party in Indonesia. The party was founded on 28 October 2021 by Sukoharjo activist and local organisation chief Tuntas Subagyo, who serves as the party chairperson.

The party is the incarnation of Surakarta-based public organisation Tikus Pithi Hanata Baris, which is best known as the sponsor of Bagyo Wahyono, the independent candidate who challenged Gibran Rakabuming Raka in the 2020 Surakarta mayoral election.  The party advertises themselves as a clean slate as no national figures participated in the party's founding.

In June 2022, leaders of the dormant Ulema National Awakening Party (PKNU) decided to merge with PKR, significantly strengthening the party in the run-up to the 2024 election. However, the KPU deemed the party not qualified to participate in the elections, and subsequent efforts to appeal the rejection to the General Election Organiser Honorary Council (DKPP) is ongoing.

Party organisation 
 Chairperson: Tuntas Subagyo
Secretary General: Sigit Prawoso
Deputy secretary general for internal affairs: Maman Lesmana
Deputy secretary general for general affairs: Susiloadji
Deputy secretary general for governance affairs: Budi Suprayogi
Treasurer: Bambang Wicaksono Imam Suwongso
Deputy treasurer for internal affairs: Erni Setyowati
Deputy treasurer for party programmes: Dianna Fatmawati

References

Pancasila political parties
Political parties in Indonesia
Political parties established in 2021
2021 establishments in Indonesia